Northern Virginia Community College (NVCC; informally known as NOVA) is a public community college composed of six campuses and four centers in the Northern Virginia suburbs of Washington, D.C. Northern Virginia Community College is the third-largest multi-campus community college in the United States and the largest educational institution in the Commonwealth of Virginia.

The college is part of the Virginia Community College System. Anne M. Kress has been its president since January 13, 2020. NOVA has campuses in Alexandria, Annandale, Loudoun County, Manassas, Springfield and Woodbridge.

History
The college was established on February 8, 1965, under the name Northern Virginia Technical College. In the fall of 1965, the college opened with 761 students in a single building in Bailey's Crossroads under president Robert L. McKee. To accommodate an ever-growing student body, the college purchased  in Annandale in 1966 to create the first of six permanent campus sites. NOVA has also offered distance learning courses since 1975.

Academics
The college includes nearly 75,000 students and more than 2,500 faculty and staff members. NOVA is also one of the most internationally diverse colleges in the United States, with a student body consisting of individuals from more than 180 countries. NOVA is accredited by the Southern Association of Colleges and Schools and offers more than 160 degrees at the associate's level and certificate programs. NOVA also offers distance learning programs through their Extended Learning Institute (ELI) and continuing education courses through Workforce Development.

NOVA offers dual-enrollment so high-school students can enroll in classes at the age of 16.

NOVA offers a variety of courses, and encourages students to enroll in four-year colleges after completing their NOVA education. Its feeder program guarantees admission to partnered intrastate schools which include George Mason University in Fairfax, the University of Virginia in Charlottesville, The College of William and Mary in Williamsburg, Virginia Tech in Blacksburg, Old Dominion University in Norfolk, and Longwood University in Farmville. Private Washington-area schools recruit at NOVA also, including American University, Georgetown, Marymount University in Arlington, Trinity Washington University, and George Washington University, and out-of state schools such as Slippery Rock University in Pennsylvania, West Virginia University, and even the University of Missouri at Kansas City.

Campuses
The college is served by a library system extending across all six campuses and the Arlington Center. NOVA Libraries contain more than 250,000 volumes and subscribe to more than 200 databases, many of these purchased through the Virtual Library of Virginia, meaning that NOVA has access to many of the same resources as the other colleges and universities in Virginia.

Alexandria 

The Alexandria Campus is located in Alexandria and primarily serves the residents of the City of Alexandria, Arlington County, Falls Church, and eastern Fairfax County. The campus grew from one building constructed on a 22.5-acre site in 1971 to three buildings on 51.4 acres in 1980. Additions to the original Bisdorf Building and the Engineering/Automotive Technology Building was opened in 1980. In that year, the John Tyler School was also purchased from the City of Alexandria and incorporated as part of the campus. The Alexandria Campus also maintains classrooms in leased facilities at off-campus locations. The Rachel M. Schlesinger Concert Hall and Arts Center was completed in 2001. In Spring 2006, under the auspices of the Alexandria Campus, the Arlington Center opened for classes.

Annandale 

The Annandale Campus is located in central Fairfax County and primarily serves the residents of the county. The campus began as one building constructed in 1967 on a 78-acre site. In 1969, three additional buildings were erected and the TV/Technical Building followed in 1970. The Nursing Building was completed in 1972. The Brault Building, which houses college staff, was completed in 1984, and recent renovations were complete in 2015. The Richard J. Ernst Community Cultural Center, which serves the college and the community, was completed in 1990. The MacDiarmid Building was completed in 1997. In Spring 2006, work was completed on a six-level, 825-space parking garage for faculty, staff, students, and visitors. The Student Services Building opened in Fall 2011, and was renamed the Mark Warner Student Services Building after Virginia Senator Mark Warner in 2016. The Annandale Campus also provides off-campus instruction at various locations.

Loudoun 

The Loudoun Campus is located in Sterling and primarily serves the residents of northern Fairfax County and Loudoun County. Construction began on a 91.4-acre site in 1972 and was completed in 1974 with four permanent buildings, the temporary Interior Design Building, and greenhouse/laboratories. Under the auspices of the Loudoun Campus, the Reston Center opened for classes in spring 2006 and the Signal Hill Center opened for classes in Fall 2009. In Fall 2012, the Learning Commons building opened at the Loudoun Campus. The Higher Education Center opened in 2015, and was renamed the Robert G. Templin Higher Education Center in 2016. The Loudoun Campus also maintains classrooms in leased off-campus facilities.

Manassas
The Manassas Campus is located in western Prince William County on a 100-acre site next to the Manassas National Battlefield. The campus primarily serves the residents of western Prince William and Fairfax counties and the cities of Manassas and Manassas Park. In 1999, the Mary Louise Jackson Amphitheater was opened. In 2008, under the auspices of the Manassas Campus, the Innovation Park location opened for classes. In Spring 2012, the Harry J. Parrish Hall opened at the Manassas Campus.

Medical Education (MEC) 

The Medical Education Campus (MEC) opened in the Fall of 2003 in Springfield. The MEC is a collaborative effort between NOVA, George Mason University, Virginia Commonwealth University, and regional public school systems. The MEC offers many different health-related programs and features state-of-the-art classrooms and laboratories, dental clinics, and a clinical practice site for nursing and allied health students. The MEC offers a special nursing program called Momentum 2+1 that specifically prepares graduates to transfer to the Bachelor of Science degree in Nursing at George Mason University. The MEC is also a member of the NoVa HealthFORCE, an initiative of The Northern Virginia Health Care Workforce Alliance (NVHCW A), addressing issues in the Health Care profession.

Woodbridge 
The Woodbridge Campus is located in eastern Prince William County and primarily serves the residents of the county. Classes were offered in temporary community facilities from 1972 through 1975. Campus construction began in 1974 on a 109-acre site. A four-story building was completed in 1975; Phase II of this building was completed in 1990. The campus has also added the heating, ventilation, and air conditioning buildings and several temporary facilities. In Fall 2013, the Woodbridge Campus opened the Arts and Science Building, and in 2015, unveiled the Regional Center for Workforce Education and Training. The W Woodbridge Campus provides off-campus instruction at several locations, including area high schools and the Quantico and Fort Belvoir military bases.

Athletics
NOVA started intercollegiate athletics in 2011 as a member of the National Junior College Athletic Association (NJCAA). The college sponsors women's volleyball, men's soccer, women's cross country, men's basketball, women's basketball, men's lacrosse, and women's softball at the intercollegiate varsity level. In addition, NOVA has a club ice hockey team that is a member of the American Collegiate Hockey Association (ACHA). NOVA added a varsity esports team in the Fall 2018 as a member of the National Association of Collegiate Esports (NACE).

The college introduced Ace, the Nighthawk, in 2017 as the first mascot of the modern era of NOVA Athletics.

NJCAA Region 20 Championships 

 2014 – Division III Women's Cross Country
 2014 – Division II Women's Volleyball
 2015 – Division I Women's Cross Country
 2016 – Division I Women's Cross Country
 2017 – Division I Women's Cross Country
 2018 – Division II Women's Volleyball

Notable alumni
 Carol Banawa (born 1982), singer
 Doug Mills (born 1960), photojournalist
 Ashley Wagner (born 1991), figure skater

Notable faculty
Jill Biden, English professor, current first lady of the United States.

See also
Northern Virginia Community College, Annandale
Goodwill Scholarships

References

External links
 Northern Virginia Community College
  (includes historic information on the college administration, college operations, and campus locations)
 NOVA Libraries
 Above the Fold—The college-wide newspaper of NOVA

1964 establishments in Virginia
Education in Alexandria, Virginia
Education in Fairfax County, Virginia
Education in Loudoun County, Virginia
Education in Prince William County, Virginia
Educational institutions established in 1964
Manassas, Virginia
Northern Virginia
Springfield, Virginia
Two-year colleges in the United States
Universities and colleges accredited by the Southern Association of Colleges and Schools
Virginia Community College System